St. Charles is a home rule-class city in Hopkins County, Kentucky, United States. The population was 277 at the 2010 U.S. Census.

History
St. Charles was settled as a coal mining camp in 1872 on land purchased from J.I.D. Woodruff by the Saint Bernard Mining Company. In 1873, the post office was established under the name "Woodruff", but when the city was incorporated in 1874, the name was changed to "St. Charles" for now unknown reasons.

Geography
St. Charles is located in southern Hopkins County at  (37.184139, -87.555164). U.S. Route 62 passes through the southern part of the community, leading east  to Nortonville and west  to Dawson Springs.

Demographics

As of the census of 2000, there were 309 people, 120 households, and 90 families residing in the city. The racial makeup of the city was 98.71% White, 0.32% Pacific Islander, and 0.97% from two or more races.

There were 120 households, out of which 37.5% had children under the age of 18 living with them, 59.2% were married couples living together, 10.8% had a female householder with no husband present, and 24.2% were non-families. 21.7% of all households were made up of individuals, and 10.0% had someone living alone who was 65 years of age or older. The average household size was 2.58 and the average family size was 3.02.

In the city, the population was spread out, with 25.9% under the age of 18, 6.5% from 18 to 24, 32.7% from 25 to 44, 22.0% from 45 to 64, and 12.9% who were 65 years of age or older. The median age was 36 years. For every 100 females, there were 98.1 males. For every 100 females age 18 and over, there were 102.7 males.

The median income for a household in the city was $20,469, and the median income for a family was $20,000. Males had a median income of $21,875 versus $13,750 for females. The per capita income for the city was $10,230. About 26.1% of families and 29.2% of the population were below the poverty line, including 40.6% of those under the age of eighteen and 24.4% of those 65 or over.

References

External links

Populated places established in 1874
Saint Charles, Kentucky
Saint Charles, Kentucky
1874 establishments in Kentucky